The Koala Park Sanctuary is a privately owned and run wildlife park located at West Pennant Hills in Sydney, Australia. The park is known for its collection of koalas and other animals and is set in a rainforest-like park.

History
Construction on the Koala Park Sanctuary began in the 1920s and the park opened in October 1930. The sanctuary was established by Noel Burnet as a way to combat the declining number of koalas in the wild. He spent the remainder of his life dedicated to researching and preserving the animals habitat.

Animals

The park is a walk-through wildlife park; most of the animals are contained behind wire and cage style exhibits. The following animals are currently held in the parks collection:

 Koalas
 Peacocks
 Little penguins
 Cockatoos
 Dingoes
 Emus
 Kangaroos
 Wombats
 Echidnas
Native Birds

Events
The park has a live sheep shearing exhibition run at various times throughout the day called "The Stockman's Camp." It also recounts Australian bush stories. The park also allows visitors to handle the animals, abiding by the state Koala Handling Time.

Conservation
The Koala Park Sanctuary opened a Koala Research Hospital in 1930. The hospital cares for sick and injured native animals and releases them back into the wild. It is open to the public and provides education about native animals and the problems faced by the koalas living close to human areas.

Controversy
In December 2010, the Department of Primary Industries inspectors reported finding ageing and dirty animal exhibits, drainage problems, and out-of-date records. The inspectors issued a series of notices to Koala Park Sanctuary to fix the issues. A newspaper editor attended the park and claimed a number of issues had not been resolved and believed that animals were suffering. However, an RSPCA inspector who visited the park said he did not believe any of the animals were suffering or had been neglected or were malnourished.

On 2 February 2016, the RSPCA fined the sanctuary $75,000 and banned them from acquiring new koalas for six months due to a koala being dehydrated with an emaciated body and all five showing signs of chlamydia.

See also
Koala Farm, Adelaide
Lone Pine Koala Sanctuary, Brisbane

References

External links

Zoos in New South Wales
Wildlife parks in Australia
1930 establishments in Australia
Buildings and structures in Sydney
Parks in Sydney
The Hills Shire
Koalas
Animal sanctuaries
Tourist_attractions_in_Sydney
Zoos established in 1930